

Events

January events
 January 1 – The national railway operator in the Republic of Ireland, Great Southern Railways, with responsibility for the southern part of the Irish railway network is merged into a new national transport operator, Córas Iompair Éireann (CIÉ).
 January 10 – Los Angeles streetcars make their last run.
 January 12 – Bituminous Coal Research Incorporated's Locomotive Study Group, made up of representatives from eastern railroads and locomotive manufacturers in the United States, meets to find ways to combat the rise of the diesel locomotive. They decide reciprocating steam is dead, and to explore coal-fired turbines.
 January 19 – United States Army Transportation Corps personnel operate their first train on the Luzon Military Railway (over Manila Railway Company track) in the Philippines.

February events
 February 23 – The Treuchtlingen railway station in Bavaria is bombed during World War II; with over 600 killed and 1500 injured, it is the worst railroad disaster in German history.
 February – General Motors Electro-Motive Division introduces the EMD E7.

March events
 March 6 – German military engineers blow up the Deutsche Reichsbahn's Hohenzollern Bridge across the Rhine at Cologne to inhibit the Allied assault on the city.
 March 25 – Virginian Railway takes delivery of its first 2-6-6-6 (class AG) steam locomotives from Lima Locomotive Works.

April events
 April 13 – Franklin D. Roosevelt's funeral train begins its journey.
 April 27 – Austria's state railway becomes independent of the Deutsche Reichsbahn as the Österreichische Staatseisenbahn (ÖStB).
 April – The first airlifts of U.S. Army Transportation Corps metre-gauge petrol locomotives into Burma take place.

May events
 May 12 – The Rev. W. V. Awdry's book for children The Three Railway Engines is published in Leicester, England, the first in what is to become The Railway Series.
 May 14 – Lima Locomotive Works ships the last Shay locomotive: Western Maryland Railway number 6.
 May 25 – 'La Trochita'  narrow gauge railway in Patagonia is completed throughout to Esquel, Argentina.

July events
 July 16
 A train collision near Munich, Germany kills 102 prisoners of war.
 Canadian National Railway opens its ore dock at Port Arthur, Ontario.
 July 23 – Chicago, Burlington and Quincy Railroad introduces the first Vistadome car, Silver Dome, in the consist of the Twin Cities Zephyr.
 July 30 – First SNCF Class 141R 2-8-2 steam locomotive completed by Lima Locomotive Works in the United States for service in France. 1340 of the class are built in North America.
 July 31 – General Motors Electro-Motive Division completes the EMD F3 demonstrator.

August events 
 August 9 – Michigan train wreck: Near Michigan City, North Dakota, the second section of the Great Northern Railway's Empire Builder rear-ends the stalled first section at an estimated 45 mph, killing 34 people and injuring 110 others. The first section had been forced to stop due to a hotbox on the locomotive's tender; the collision occurs before a flagman had time to protect the rear of the train.
 August 14 – Kyōbashi Station becomes one of the last sites to be bombed in Japan during World War II when a one-ton bomb directly strikes the Katamachi Line platform as part of the bombing of Osaka, killing 700 to 800 evacuees.
 August 24 – The Yosemite Valley Railroad, which has operated between Merced, California, and Yosemite National Park, runs its last trains.
 August – The Chinese Eastern Railway comes under the joint control of China and the Soviet Union.

September events
 September 27 – The Arlberg Orient Express resumes operations after World War II.

October events
 October 2 – Piccadilly Circus tube station becomes the first on the London Underground to be lit by fluorescent light.

December events
 December 1 – The Milwaukee Road emerges from its 1935 bankruptcy through reorganization.
 December 13 – The New York Central Railroad places what is up to now the largest single order for passenger equipment: 420 cars.

Unknown date events
 Tata Engineering and Locomotive Company established in India.

Births

Deaths

June deaths
 June 14 – Matthew S. Sloan, president of the Missouri–Kansas–Texas Railroad, in New York City (born 1881).

July deaths 
 July 5 – Julius Dorpmüller, German railway administrator (born 1869).

October deaths
 October 12 – Charles Fairburn, Chief Mechanical Engineer of the London, Midland and Scottish Railway 1944–1945 (born 1887).
 October 27 – George Hughes, Chief Mechanical Engineer for the Lancashire and Yorkshire Railway 1904–1922, the London and North Western Railway 1922–1923 and the London, Midland and Scottish Railway 1925–1931 (born 1865).

Accidents

References